The Southern Miss Golden Eagles baseball team represents the University of Southern Mississippi in NCAA Division I college baseball. They participate as a member of the Sun Belt Conference. The team has been to 18 NCAA Tournaments and served as an NCAA Regional host in 2003, 2017, 2022 and NCAA Super Regional host in 2022. The Southern Miss baseball team has produced 19 All-Americans. and currently has 4 players on Major League rosters. Southern Miss has won six Conference USA Regular Season Championships (2003, 2011, 2013, 2017, 2018, 2022) and five Tournament Championships (2003, 2010, 2016, 2018,2019) and is the only team in CUSA to participate in every conference baseball tournament since the conference's inception.  The Golden Eagles rich history began in 1912 with a game against the Detroit Tigers, a contest which Southern Miss lost by a score of 24–2. The Golden Eagles play at Pete Taylor Park/Hill Denson Field on the campus of the University of Southern Mississippi and consistently rank in the top 20 nationally in NCAA attendance figures.

Southern Miss qualified for its first College World Series in 2009 after winning the Atlanta Regional and the Gainesville Super Regional. They would post an 0–2 record in Omaha, losing 7–6 against top-seeded Texas and 11–4 versus fourth-seeded North Carolina.

Head coaches

Notable alumni
John Bale – MLB Pitcher, Kansas City Royals
Chad Bradford – MLB Pitcher, Baltimore Orioles
Jim Davenport – MLB Pitcher, San Francisco Giants
Brian Dozier – MLB Infielder – Washington Nationals
Jarrett Hoffpauir – MLB Infielder, San Diego Padres
Pat Rapp – MLB Pitcher, Florida Marlins
Kevin Young – MLB Infielder, Pittsburgh Pirates
Nick Sandlin – MLB Pitcher, Cleveland Guardians

Year-by-year results

See also
List of NCAA Division I baseball programs

References

External links